Sanyu may refer to:


Places
Sanyu, Chipwi, Burma
Sanyu Township, Gansu, China

People
Sanyu (painter) (1901–1966), Chinese-French painter
Cinderella Sanyu (born 1985), Ugandan musician
Jemimah Sanyu (born 1986), Ugandan musician, performer, producer, and voice coach

Television

Sanyu (TV series)

See also
San Yu (1918–1996), Burmese general and President of Burma